Abell 3266 is a galaxy cluster in the southern sky. It is part of the Horologium-Reticulum Supercluster. The galaxy cluster is one of the largest in the southern sky, and one of the largest mass concentrations in the nearby universe.

The Department of Physics at the University of Maryland, Baltimore County discovered that a large mass of gas is hurtling through the cluster at a speed of 750 km/s (466 miles/second). The mass is billions of solar masses, approximately 3 million light-years in diameter and is the largest of its kind discovered as of June 2006.

See also
 Abell catalogue
 List of Abell clusters
 X-ray astronomy

References

External links 
 Abel 3266 on SIMBAD
 

Horologium Supercluster
Galaxy clusters
3266
Abell richness class 2

Reticulum (constellation)